Wawasee Village is an unincorporated community in Turkey Creek Township, Kosciusko County, in the U.S. state of Indiana.

History
Wawasee Village took its name from Wawasee Lake. The lake was named after Wawasee, a Miami chief.

Geography

References

Unincorporated communities in Kosciusko County, Indiana
Unincorporated communities in Indiana